Kuşçular is a village in the Tosya District of Kastamonu Province in Turkey. Its population is 208 (2021).

References

Villages in Tosya District